Events in the year 1938 in India.
Indian independence – Government of India Act gives Indians a role in governing their provinces.

Incumbents
 Emperor of India – George VI
 Viceroy of India – Victor Hope, 2nd Marquess of Linlithgow

Events 
 National income - 29,799 million
 Minor engagements on the North West Frontier throughout the year.

Law
 December – Announcement that the Ottawa trade agreement would not be continued after 31 March 1939.
Good Conduct Prisoners' Probational Release Act
Insurance Act
Manoeuvres, Field Firing and Artillery Practice Act
Cutchi Memons Act

Births
7 January – B. Saroja Devi, actress.
13 January
Shivkumar Sharma, musician. (died 2022)
Nabaneeta Dev Sen, novelist, children's author and poet. (died 2019)
18 March – Shashi Kapoor, Bollywood actor. (died 2017)
31 March – Sheila Dikshit, politician and Chief Minister of Delhi. (died 2019)
23 April  S. Janaki, playback singer.
19 May – Girish Karnad, writer, playwright, actor and director. (died 2019)
10 June – Rahul Bajaj, businessman (died 2022)
12 June – Yesudasan, political cartoonist (died 2021)
1 July 
 Hariprasad Chaurasia, classical flutist
 Durai Murugan, lawyer and politician
9 July – Sanjeev Kumar, actor (died 1985).
13 July – Thomas Savundaranayagam, Sri Lanka Tamil priest, former Roman Catholic Bishop of Jaffna
15 July – Pilot Baba, Indian Air Force fighter pilot, later guru
19 July – Dom Moraes, poet, writer and columnist (died 2004).
19 July – Jayant Narlikar, astrophysicist.
25 July – Sudhir Kakar, psychoanalyst and writer.
8 September – Poornachandra Tejaswi, writer and novelist (died 2007).
17 November – Shamim Hanafi, Urdu scholar (died 2021)
11 December – T. S. R. Subramanian, politician (died 2018)

Full date unknown
Shashi Deshpande, novelist.
R. K. Krishna Kumar, business executive. (died 2022)
Manohar Singh, theatre director and actor. (died 2002)

Deaths
16 January – Sharat Chandra Chatterji, novelist (born 1876).
14 November – Mahatma Hansraj, educationist, Arya Samaj leader (born 1864)

References

 
India
Years of the 20th century in India